Australia national hockey team may refer to:
 Australia men's national field hockey team (Kookaburras)
 Australia women's national field hockey team (Hockeyroos)
 Australia men's national ice hockey team (Mighty Roos)
 Australia women's national ice hockey team (Mighty Jills)
 Australia men's national inline hockey team
 Australia women's national inline hockey team